This article contains information about the literary events and publications of 1713.

Events
March 12 – Richard Steele and Joseph Addison found the short-lived The Guardian; in the same year, Steele founds another periodical, ostensibly as a sequel to it, the likewise short-lived The Englishman.
April 14 – The first performance is given in London of Addison's libertarian play Cato, a Tragedy, which will be influential on both sides of the Atlantic.
October – Alexander Pope announces that he is to begin a definitive translation of the works of Homer.
unknown date – Vitsentzos Kornaros's early 17th-century Cretan romantic epic poem Erotokritos (Ἐρωτόκριτος), is printed, for the first time, in Venice.

New books

Prose
John Arbuthnot – Proposals for printing a very curious discourse... a treatise of the art of political lying, with an abstract of the first volume ("The Art of Political Lying")
Jane Barker – The Amours of Bosvil and Galesia
Richard Bentley (as Phileleutherus Lipsiensis) – Remarks upon a Late Discourse of Free-thinking (see Collins below)
George Berkeley – Three Dialogues between Hylas and Philonous
Nicolas Boileau-Despréaux – Dialogue sur les héros de roman
Robert Challe – Les Illustres Françaises (The Illustrious French Lovers)
Anthony Collins – A Discourse of Free-thinking
Daniel Defoe
And What if the Pretender Should Come?
A General History of Trade
Reasons Against the Succession of the House of Hanover
John Dennis – Remarks upon Cato
Abel Evans – Vertumnus
John Gay
Rural Sports
The Fan
Edmund Gibson – Codex Juris Ecclesiastici Anglicani
Antoine Hamilton – Mémoires du comte de Gramont (published anonymously)
John Hughes – Letters of Abelard and Heloise (widely published translation)
Henri Joutel – Journal historique du dernier voyage que feu M. de La Sale fit dans le golfe de Mexique (Joutel's journal of La Salle's last voyage, 1684–1687)
Thomas Parnell – An Essay on the Different Stiles of Poetry
Charles-Irénée Castel de Saint-Pierre – Projet pour rendre la paix perpétuelle en Europe
Jonathan Swift
Mr. C--n's Discourse of Free-thinking, Put into Plain English (see above, Collins)
Part of the Seventh Epistle of the First Book of Horace Imitated
John Toland – Reasons for Naturalizing the Jews in Great Britain and Ireland
Ned Ward – The History of the Grand Rebellion

Drama
Anonymous – The Apparition
Joseph Addison – Cato, a Tragedy
José de Cañizares – Don Juan de Espina en Milán
John Gay – The Wife of Bath
Charles Shadwell – The Merry Wives of Broad Street
William Taverner – The Female Advocates

Poetry
Henry Carey – Poems on Several Occasions (includes "Sally in Our Alley" and "Namby Pamby")
Anne Finch – Miscellany Poems on Several Occasions
Alexander Pope
Windsor Forest
Ode for Musick
Edward Young
An Epistle to Lord Lansdowne
A Poem on the Last Day
See also 1713 in poetry

Births
January 13 – Charlotte Charke (Charlotte Cibber), English novelist, dramatist and actress (died 1760)
February 20 – Anna Maria Elvia, Swedish poet (died 1784)
April 12 – Guillaume Thomas François Raynal, French writer (died 1796)
June 11 – Edward Capell, English Shakespeare scholar (died 1781)
July 9 – John Newbery, English publisher and writer for children (died 1767)
October 5 – Denis Diderot, French encyclopedist (died 1784)
October 25 – Marie Jeanne Riccoboni (née de Mézières), French novelist and actress (died 1792)
November 24 – Laurence Sterne, Irish-born novelist and cleric (died 1768)
December 19 – Jonathan Toup, English classicist and critic (died 1785)

Deaths
January 5 – Jean Chardin, French travel writer (born 1643)
January 11 – Pierre Jurieu, French Protestant leader and religious writer (born 1637)
May 20 – Thomas Sprat, English writer, poet and bishop (born 1635)
September 11 – Johannes Voet, Dutch jurist and legal writer (born 1647)
September 18 – Samuel Cobb, English poet and critic (born 1675)
October 20 – Archibald Pitcairne, Scottish physician and writer (born 1652)
October 30 – John Barret, English religious writer and Presbyterian minister (born 1631)
December 14 – Thomas Rymer, English Historiographer Royal (born 1641)

Notes

 
Years of the 18th century in literature